Gagan may refer to:

Given name
Gagan Bhagat, Indian politician and member of the Jammu and Kashmir Legislative Assembly
Gagan Biyani, Indian American serial entrepreneur, marketer, and journalist
Gagan Singh Bhandari, Nepalese General
Gagan Bulathsinghala, Sri Lankan air officer
Gagan Chandra Chatterjee, Indian classical violinist
Gagan Dosanjh (born 1990), Indo-Canadian soccer player 
Gagan Harkara, Bengali Baul poet 
Gagan Khoda (born 1974), Indian cricketer
Gagan Malik, Indian actor
Gagan Malik (cricketer) (born 1976), Indian cricketer
Gagan Mohindra, British politician
Gagan Narang (born 1983), Indian shooter and Olympian
Gagan Sikand, Canadian politician and MP
Gagan Ajit Singh (born 1980), Indian field hockey player
Gagan Thapa (born 1976), Nepali politician and government minister
Gagan Ullalmath (born 1992), Indian swimmer

Surname
William Gagan (born 1981), American photojournalist

See also
GAGAN, GPS-aided GEO augmented navigation
Gagan railway station, Pakistan
Gagana